is a Japanese footballer who plays as a forward for  club Iwaki FC.

Youth career
Between 2014 and 2015, Iwabuchi represented Tono High School in the Japan High School Soccer Tournament, however his school were knocked out in the first round of both tournaments.
He then went on to represent Sendai University in the Japan College Prime Minister's Cup and the Japan Inter College Tournament in 2017 and 2018, making 8 appearances in these competitions. In 2019, Iwabuchi made his first appearance in the Emperor's Cup, scoring an 82nd-minute winner in a 3–2 victory over Iwaki FC in the first round. Sendai were eventually knocked out in the second round, losing 2–1 to J.League team Yokohama FC, with Iwabuchi playing 32 minutes after coming on as a second-half substitute.

Club career
In 2020, Iwabuchi moved to Japan Football League club Iwaki FC. He scored on his debut for the club in July in a 2–1 league victory over Nara Club. Iwabuchi additionally went on to make 15 appearances across all competitions in his first season, scoring 3 goals in total.

In 2021, he played 25 games and scored 6 goals, as Iwaki were crowned champions of the JFL and were promoted to the J3 League for the first time in their history.

In 2022, Iwabuchi was a regular starter in his first season in the J3 League, scoring regularly and following a hat-trick in a 6–0 win over YSCC Yokohama was awarded the J3 Monthly MVP award. He played 31 games and scored 10 goals, as Iwaki were crowned champions of the J3 League and were promoted to the J2 League for the first time in their history. On 17 December 2022, Iwabuchi renewed his contract with club for the upcoming 2023 season.

Career statistics

Club
.

References

External links
Profile at Iwaki FC
Profile at J.League

1997 births
Living people
Japanese footballers
Association football forwards
Association football people from Iwate Prefecture
Sendai University alumni
Iwaki FC players
J3 League players
J2 League players